The Kuwaiti Division One was introduced for the 2006/2007 season. Both Al Shabab and Al Fahaheel claimed the top 2 spots which earned them promotion to the Kuwaiti Premier League 2008-09.

Standings

Top scorers

References

External links 
 Kuwaiti Division One

Kuwaiti Division One seasons
2007–08 in Kuwaiti football
Kuwait